The Suceava Power Station is a large thermal power plant located in Suceava, Romania, having two generation groups of 50 MW each resulting a total electricity generation capacity of 100 MW.

See also

 List of power stations in Romania

References

External links
Description 

Coal-fired power stations in Romania